Cockroach Island is an uninhabited island of the British Virgin Islands in the Caribbean.  It is located near North Sound, Virgin Gorda, amongst a collection of islands known as "The Dogs" or "The Dog Islands".

The roseate tern (Sterna dougallii) is found on the island. Reef flats north of the island provide habitat for Montastrea cavernosa and Gorgonia corals.

References

Dog Islands